Europium(II) oxide (EuO) is a chemical compound which is one of the oxides of europium. In addition to europium(II) oxide, there is also europium(III) oxide and the mixed valence europium(II,III) oxide.

Preparation
Europium(II) oxide can be prepared by the reduction of Europium(III) oxide with elemental europium at 800°C and subsequent vacuum distillation at 1150°C.
Eu2O3 + Eu → 3 EuO

It is also possible to synthesize from the reaction of europium oxychloride and lithium hydride.
2 EuOCl + 2 LiH → 2 EuO + 2 LiCl + H2

In modern research, thin films can be manufactured by molecular beam epitaxy directly from europium atoms and oxygen molecules. These films have contamination of Eu3+ of less than 1%.

Properties
Europium(II) oxide is a violet compound as a bulk crystal and transparent blue in thin film form. It is unstable in humid atmosphere, slowly turning into the yellow europium(II) hydroxide hyrdrate and then to white europium(III) hydroxide. EuO crystallizes in a cubic sodium chloride structure with a lattice paramater a = 0.5144 nm. The compound is often non-stoichiometric, containing up to 4% Eu3+ and small amounts of elemental europium. However, since 2008 high purity crystaline EuO films can be created in ultra high vacuum conditions. These films have a crystallite size of about 4 nm.

Europium(II) oxide is ferromagnetic with a Curie Temperature of 69.3 K. With the addition of about 5-7% elemental europium, this increases to 79 K. It also displays colossal magnetoresistance, with a dramatic increase in conductivity below the Curie temperature. One more way to increase the Curie temperature is doping with gadolinium, holmium, or lanthanum.

Europium(II) oxide is a semiconductor with a band gap of 1.12 eV.

Applications
Based on the properties of europium(II) oxide, thin layers of the materials of the material deposited on silicon are being studied for use as spin filters. Spin filter materials only allow electrons of a certain spin to pass, blocking electron of the opposite spin.

References

Europium(II) compounds
Oxides
Rock salt crystal structure